The Women's freestyle 60 kg is a competition featured at the 2017 European Wrestling Championships, and was held in Novi Sad, Serbia on May 3.

Medalists

Results
Legend
F — Won by fall

Top half

Repechage

References
Draw
Results

Women's freestyle 60 kg